AMARIA BB is a Jamaican-English singer-songwriter.

Biography 
UK Born Amaria, from Hackney, London where she currently resides with her family. She discovered her passion for singing when she was around 8 years old.

In September 2021, she performed at the Strawberries & Creem Festival alongside the likes of Little Simz, Koffee and Burna Boy. She has been featured on BBC's Radio 1Xtra.

She is signed with Columbia Records, a frontline label of Sony Music Entertainment. She also first appeared on the British TV show Got What It Takes? at 12 years old and won the very first season which premiered on January 6, 2016.

Discography

Singles and EPs 

 2013: Moan Interlude
 2019: Cha$e the Bag
 2021: Fundz (ft. Skillibeng)
 2021: Slow Motion
2022: Secrets

References 

Jamaican singer-songwriters
21st-century Jamaican women singers